Verticordia pholidophylla is a flowering plant in the myrtle family, Myrtaceae and is endemic to the south-west of Western Australia. It is a shrub with a single branch at the base and many side branches with overlapping yellowish leaves and greenish-white to cream, cup-shaped, feathery flowers.

Description

Flowering time is from September to November.

Taxonomy and naming
Verticordia pholidophylla was first formally described by Ferdinand von Mueller in 1859 from a specimen collected by Augustus Oldfield and the description was published in Fragmenta phytographiae Australiae. The specific epithet (pholidophylla) is derived from the Ancient Greek words  meaning "a scale" and  meaning "a leaf", referring to the small, scale-like leaves of this species.

In his review of the genus in 1991, Alex George placed this species in subgenus Eperephes, section Verticordella along with V. pennigera, V. halophila, V. blepharophylla, V. lindleyi, V. carinata, V. attenuata, V. drummondii, V. wonganensis, V. paludosa, V. luteola, V. bifimbriata, V. tumida, V. mitodes,V. centipeda, V. auriculata, V. spicata and V. hughanii.

Distribution and habitat
This verticordia is found in and near the Kalbarri National Park where it grows in sand or clay, often in areas that are wet in winter in the Geraldton Sandplains biogeographic region.

Ecology
A native bee, the blue-banded bee, Amegilla cingulata has been observed visiting flowers of this verticordia.

Conservation
 Verticordia pholidophylla is classified as "Not Threatened" by the Western Australian Government Department of Parks and Wildlife.

Use in horticulture
This verticordia is usually propagated from cuttings but can also be grown from seed. When established in a garden, it flowers for longer than in the wild and tolerates drought and light frost. First flowering usually occurs after three years.

References

pholidophylla
Rosids of Western Australia
Eudicots of Western Australia
Plants described in 1859
Taxa named by Ferdinand von Mueller